Constance L. Jackson is a business start-up professional in health technology and filmmaking. She is the Chief Executive & Innovation Officer Los Angeles-based technology company MediaHealth Technologies, LLC. The company conducts research and development of web-based tools for behavioral health.  Jackson has spoken at national and international conferences including Soroptimist International, The American Public Health Association, and the National Organization for Women on issues affecting cultural understanding. She is the past president of Permanent Productions, Inc., now Permanent Production.  She is the writer, director and producer of feature-length documentary films. In 2008, Jackson published a book about abolitionist Lydia Maria Child, Over the River… Life of Lydia Maria Child, Abolitionist for Freedom. The book includes an introduction by historian Professor Carolyn L. Karcher.

Filmography
Family Caregivers Educational Online Tool (2019), co-writer, producer, and director. University of Southern California, Leonard Davis School of Gerontology contracted film production

 Red Hope? The Blacklisting of Hope Foye (Her Story, Her Songs) C (2011), narrated by Keith David)) 
Over the River…Life of Lydia Maria Child, Abolitionist for Freedom (2008), narrated by Diahann Carroll
Blitz Attack: The Andrea Hines Story Part I (2005), Blitz Attack: The Andrea Hines Story Part II - Revelations]] (2008)

References

External links
 Permanent Productions, Inc.
 Dr. Beth Halbert, host of "Bridging the Parent/Teen Gap", speaks with Constance L. Jackson.
 Constance L. Jackson filmography at the Internet Movie Database

Living people
Year of birth missing (living people)
Place of birth missing (living people)
Writers from Los Angeles
Film directors from Los Angeles